The German foreign office (Auswärtiges Amt (AA)) had a sizable network of diplomatic missions when Nazis came to power in 1933. While it was a deeply traditional and elitist organisation within the German civil service, it enthusiastically helped the Nazis prosecute an ambitious foreign policy.

Listed here are the ambassadors and other senior diplomats of the AA during the Third Reich, including those with the ranks of envoy (Gesandter), ambassador (Botschafter) consul and consul general as well as chargé d'affaires (Geschäftsträger)

Abyssinia
  (1932–1935)
  (1935–1936)

Afghanistan
  (1933–1936)
  (1937–1945)

Albania
  (1930-1936)
  (1936-1941)
  (1941-1944)

Argentina
  (1933–1942)
  (1942–1944)

Austria
  (1931–1934)
 Franz von Papen (1934–1938)

Belgium
 Hugo Graf von und zu Lerchenfeld auf Köfering und Schönberg (1931-1934)
  (1934-1936)
  (1936-1938)
  (1938-1940)
  (1940-1943)

Protectorate of Bohemia and Moravia (Envoy)
  (1942-1943)
  (1943-1945)

Bolivia
 Maximilian König (1932–1936) 
  (1938–1942)

Brazil
  (1933–1937) 
 Karl Ritter (1937–1938)
 Curt Max Prüfer (1939–1942)

Bulgaria
 Eugen Rümelin	(1923–1939)	
 Herbert von Richthofen (1939–1941)	
 Adolf-Heinz Beckerle (1941–1944)

Chile
 Hans Kurd von Reiswitz und Kaderzin (1932–1934)  
  (1936–1943)

China and the Reorganized National Government of the Republic of China
 Oskar Trautmann (1935–1938)
 Heinrich Georg Stahmer (1941-1943) 
 Ernst Woermann (1943-1945)

Consul General in Canton
 Felix Alternburg (1934-1938)
 Franz Siebert (1939-1945)

Consul General in Hankou
 Enno Bracklo (1938-1947)

Consul in Jinan
 Franz Siebert (1925-1938)

Consul General in Nanjing
  (1941-1944)

Consul in Qingdao
 Enno Bracklo (1932-1938)

Consul General in Shanghai
 Hermann Kriebel (1934-1937)
  (1939-1945)
 Walther Dietrich Hoops (1945)

Consul General in Tienstin
  (1936-1941)
 Fritz Wiedemann (1941-1945)

Colombia
 Erdmann Karl Maria von Podewils-Dürniz (1928–1934)
 Werner von Hentig (1934–1936)
 Wolfgang Dittler (1936–1941)

Croatia, Independent State of
 Hermann Neubacher (1941–1941)
 Siegfried Kasche (1941–1945)

Cuba
  (1937–1939)

Czechoslovakia
 Walter Koch (1920-1935)
 Ernst Eisenlohr (1935–1938)
  (1938–1939)

Danzig,  Free City of
  (1933-1936)
  (1936-1938)
  Martin von Janson (1938-1939)

Denmark
 Herbert Freiherr von Richthofen (1930–1936)
 Cécil von Renthe-Fink (1936-1942)
 Werner Best (1942-1945)

Ecuador
 Karl Pistor (1932–1936)
 Eugen Klee (1936–1942)

Egypt
 Eberhard von Stohrer (1926–1936)

Estonia
 Otto Reinebeck (1932–1936)	 
 Hans Frohwein	(1936–1940)	

Finland
 Hans Büsing (1932–1935)
 Wipert von Blücher (1935–1944)

France 
 Roland Köster (1933–1936)
 Johannes von Welczeck (1936–1939)
 Otto Abetz (1940–1944) ambassador
 invested by Germany

Consul General in Algiers
 Erich Windels (1926–1934)	
 Hermann Terdenge (1934–1937)	
 Johannes Erhard Richter (1937–1939)

Consul General in Damascus
  (1934–1935)
 Ferdinand Sailer (1935-1939)

Consul in Hanoi 
  (1928-1936)
 Neumann (1941-1942)
 
Consul General in Marseille
 Edgar von Spiegel von und zu Peckelsheim (1942-1944)

Greece
 Ernst Eisenlohr (1931–1936)
  (1936–1941)

Guatemala
 Wilhelm von Kuhlmann (1924–1934)	
 Erich Kraske (1934–1936)	
 Otto Reinebeck (1937–1941)	
 Christian Zinsser (1941)	
  (1941)

Holy See
 Diego von Bergen (1920–1943)
 Ernst von Weizsäcker (1943–1945)

Hungary
 Hans Georg von Mackensen (1933–1937)
 Otto von Erdmannsdorff (1937–1941)
 Dietrich von Jagow (1941–1944)
 Edmund Veesenmayer (1944–1945)

Iceland
  (1939-1940)

Iraq
 Fritz Grobba (1932–1939)

Ireland
Georg Dehn-Schmidt (1923–1934)	
 Wilhelm von Kuhlmann (1934–1937)	 
 Eduard Hempel (1937–1945)

Italy and the Italian Social Republic
 Ulrich von Hassell (1932–1938)
 Hans Georg von Mackensen (1938–1942)
 Rudolf Rahn (1942–1944)

Consul General in Genoa 
  (1941-1944)

Consul General in Milan 
  (1937-1939)
  (1940)
  (1940-1941)

Consul General in Naples 
  (1943)

Consul General in Tripoli
 Gebhardt von Walther (1941-1943)

Japan
 Herbert von Dirksen (1933–1938)
 Willy Noebel (1938)
 Eugen Ott (1938–1942)
 Heinrich Georg Stahmer (1943-1945)

Consul General in Kobe
 Wagner (-1938)
 August Balser (1938-1945)

Consul General in Yokohama
 Menne (-1943)
 Heinrich Seelheim (1943-1945)

Latvia
 Georg Martius (1932–1934)
 Eckhard von Schack (1934–1938)
 Hans Ulrich von Kotze (1938–1941)

Lithuania
 Erich Zechlin (1933-1941)

Luxembourg
 Werner Freiherr von Ow-Wachendorf (1931-1934)
 Erdmann Graf von Podewilz-Dürniz (1934-1936)
 Otto von Radowitz (1936-1940)

Manchukuo
 Wilhelm Wagner

Consul General in Mukden
 Ernst Ramm

Consul General in Dairen
 Ernst Bischoff

Mexico
 Heinrich Rüdt von Collenberg (1933–1941)

Monaco
  (1943-1944)

Netherlands
 Julius von Zech-Burkersroda (1928–1940)
 Otto Bene (1940–1945)

Consul General in Batavia
 Manfred Klaiber (1938)

Nicaragua
 Hugo Otto Danckers (1936–1941)

Norway
 Heinrich Rohland (1934–1936)
 Heinrich Sahm (1936–1939)
 Curt Bräuer (1939–1940)

Paraguay
 Fritz Max Weiss (1933–1934) 
 Erhard Graf von Wedel (1934–1937)
 Hans Büsing (1937–1942)

Persia/Iran
 Wipert von Blücher (1931–1935)
 Johann Smend (1935–1939)
  (1939–1941)

Peru
 Heinrich Rohland (1924–1934)	
 Ernst Schmitt	(1934–1938)	
 Eduard Willy Noebel (1938–1942)

Poland
 Hans-Adolf von Moltke (1931–1939)

Portugal
 Hans Freytag	1933–1934
 Oswald Baron von Hoyningen-Huene 1934–1945
 Gustav Adolph von Halem (1945)

Romania
 Friedrich Werner von der Schulenburg (1931–1934)	
 Georg von Dehn-Schmidt (1934–1935)	
 Wilhelm Fabricius (1936–1940)	 
 Manfred von Killinger (1941–1944)	
  (1944)

Saudi Arabia
 Fritz Grobba (1939)

Slovak Republic
  (1939-1940)
 Manfred von Killinger (1940)
 Hanns Ludin (1941–1945)

Spain
 Count Johannes von Welczeck (1925–1936)
  (1933-1936)
 Wilhelm Faupel (1936–1937)
 Eberhard von Stohrer (1937–1942)
 Hans-Adolf von Moltke (1943)
  (1943)
 Hans-Heinrich Dieckhoff (1943–1944)
 Sigismund von Bibra (1944–1945)

Consul General in Barcelona
 Hans Kroll (-1945)

Consul in Vigo
  (1943-1945)

Sweden
 Viktor zu Wied (1933-1943)
 Hans Thomsen (1943–1945)

Switzerland
 Freiherr von Schauenburg-Herrlisheim (-1920)
 Hans Borchers (1920-1933)
 Ernst von Weizsäcker (1933–1937)
 Otto Carl Köcher (1937–1945)

Tangier International Zone
  (1941–1944)

Thailand
 Erich August Karl Nord (1933–1935)
  (1936–1941)
  (1943–1945)

Turkey
 Rudolf Nadolny (1928–1933)
 Hans von Rosenberg (1933–1935)
 Friedrich von Keller (1935–1938)
 Franz von Papen (1939–1944)

Union of Socialist Soviet Republics
 Herbert von Dirksen (1928–1933)
 Rudolf Nadolny (1933–1934)
 Friedrich-Werner Graf von der Schulenburg (1934–1941)

Consul General in Batum
 Otto Bräutigam (1940-1941)

United Kingdom
 Leopold von Hoesch (1932–1936)
 Joachim von Ribbentrop (1936–1938)
 Herbert von Dirksen (1938–1939)

Consul General in Calcutta
 Werner von Ow-Wachendorf (1933–1936) 
 Erdmann von Podewils-Dürnitz (1936–1939)

Consul General in Hong Kong
 Hermann Gipperich (1933-1939)

Consul General in Jerusalem
  (1933-1935)
  (1935-1939)

Consul General in Montreal and Ottawa (relocated in 1937)
 L. Kempff (1922-1935)
 Henry Schafhausen (1935-1937)
 Erich Windels (1937-1939)

Consul General in Pretoria
 Friedrich Wilhelm von Keßler (1931–1933)	 
 Emil Wiehl (1933–1937)	
 Rudolf Leitner (1937-1939)

Consul General in Singapore
 Walther Maenns (1931–1938)
 Adolf von Windecker (1938–1939)

Consul General in Sydney
 Rudolf Asmis (1932–1939)

Consul General in Wellington
  (1936–1938)

United States
 Hans Luther (1933–1937)
 Hans-Heinrich Dieckhoff (1937–1938)
 Hans Thomsen (1938–1941)

Consul in Boston
 Herbert Scholz (1933-1941)

Consul in Chicago
 Georg Krause-Wichmann (1939-1941)

Consul General in Cleveland
 Hans Borchers (1926-1933)
 Karl Kapp (1936-1941)

Consul General in Los Angeles
 Georg Gyssling (1933-1941)

Consul General in New Orleans
  (1934-1936)
 Edgar von Spiegel von und zu Peckelsheim (1937-1941)

Consul General in New York
 Hans Borchers (1933-1941)

Consul General in Philadelphia
 Erich Windels (1939-1941)

Consul General in San Francisco
 Fritz Wiedemann (1939-1941)

Consul General in San Juan
 Henry Freese (-1941)

Consul General in St. Louis
 Herbert Diel (-1941)

Venezuela
  (1932–1937)
 Erwin Poensgen (1937–1941)

Yugoslavia
Viktor von Heeren (1933-1941)

From

References

Nazi Party officials
Ambassadors of Nazi Germany
Nazi Party members
Lists of ambassadors of Germany